Miranda Greenstreet is a Ghanaian academic and educationist.

Career
Greenstreet worked with the University of Ghana and was at the Institute of Adult Education (now Institute of Continuing and Distance Education) where she rose to become the director of the institute. She continued to be a regular contributor to the Annual New Year School organised by the institute.

Other activities
She was the co-chair of the Coalition of Domestic Election Observers (CODEO) together with Justice V. C. R. A. C. Crabbe, a former Supreme Court Judge. She was also a member of the Civil
Society Coalition on National Reconciliation in Ghana.

Personal life and family
Miranda was married to Dennis Greenstreet who was English. They met while they were both studying at the London School of Economics in the 1950s. Her son Ivor Greenstreet is a politician and lawyer while her daughter Yvonne Greenstreet is a biotechnology executive and doctor. She was pregnant with Ivor when the Nkrumah government was overthrown on 24 February 1966 by the National Liberation Council military regime. She cited how she was threatened with detention at the time but refused to report to the military authorities after the coup d'état as she saw this as an abuse of her academic freedoms. Another son, Ian Greestreet, is the founder and chairman of Infinity Capital Partners and Member on the advisory board of the London Stock Exchange. She has a daughter, Isobel, who is a dental surgeon. Greenstreet is the granddaughter of Nana Kwame Ofori Kuma who is a member of the Royal house of the Akropong–Akuapem stool.

Honours
Professor Miranda Greenstreet Prize for the Best Graduating Female Student in the Master of Arts Programme in Adult Education - This is an annual award by the University of Ghana in honour of Miranda Greenstreet who was the Director of the then Institute of Adult Education.

Publications

References

External links
Google Scholar Citations

Living people
People from Accra
Ga-Adangbe people
Academic staff of the University of Ghana
Alumni of the London School of Economics
1933 births